Kéked is a village in Borsod-Abaúj-Zemplén County in northeastern Hungary.

History
The settlement was first mentioned in 1297 as Keked. In 1317 as Kekud, in 1319 as Quequed, between 1332-1335 as Quequed, Kykit, Kekuk and Kekud.

The 2.8 km long connecting road between Kéked and Trstené pri Hornáde was inaugurated on 21 October 2013.

References

Populated places in Borsod-Abaúj-Zemplén County